Parapontoporia is an extinct genus of dolphin that lived off the Californian coast from the Late Miocene until the genus' extinction during the Pliocene. It is related to the baiji.

References

 SDNHM Fossil Mysteries Field Guide: Long-snouted Dolphin

Prehistoric toothed whales
Miocene cetaceans
Pliocene cetaceans
Pliocene extinctions
Dolphins
Prehistoric cetacean genera
Fossil taxa described in 1984